Guthrie Group Limited was a Singaporean-Malaysian company that primarily dealt with plantations. It merged with three other plantation groups to form the world's largest plantation company with the name of Sime Darby Berhad.

Guthrie was founded in Singapore in 1821 by Alexander Guthrie as the first British trading company in Southeast Asia. Guthrie introduced rubber and oil palm in Malaysia in 1896 and 1924, respectively.

Early history 
Alexander Guthrie was born in the parish of Menmuir in Angus, Scotland, in 1796, son of David Guthrie of Burnside and his wife Margaret Guthrie, née Guthrie. He went to Singapore in 1821 to set up a trading branch of Thomas Talbot Harrington and Company. Guthrie parted company with Harrington in 1823, and his company was renamed Guthrie and Company in 1833. He retired in 1847, handing the firm over to his nephew James Guthrie, and retired to London, where he died unmarried in 1865. James Guthrie was born in Tannadice in Angus in 1814, son of Alexander's brother David and his wife, Katharine Grant. James arrived in Singapore in 1829 and became a partner in 1837. In 1846, he married Susan Scott, a distant cousin, and had two daughters and a son before Susan's death in Singapore in 1853. James left Singapore in 1856 and returned to Britain. He retired from the firm in 1876 and died in 1900. Other partners included James' nephew by marriage, John James Greenshields, whose mother Margaret Lyall Scott was the sister of Susan Scott. Greenshields was born in Liverpool in 1823 and died there in 1873. Another was James Guthrie's brother-in-law Thomas Scott, born in Dun, Angus in 1832 and died in Angus in 1902, who became a partner in 1857 and senior partner in 1867.

Acquisition by Malaysia 

In 1981, the group became a wholly Malaysian-owned company after Ismail Mohamed Ali, Khalid Ibrahim, Tengku Razaleigh Hamzah and Raja Mohar engineered a raid to take over the group at the London Stock Exchange. The takeover allowed Malaysia to return ownership of some 200,000 acres (800 km²) of agricultural land back to Malaysians. Khalid Ibrahim, CEO of Permodalan Nasional Berhad later became the CEO of the Guthrie, later known as Kumpulan Guthrie Bhd, from 1995 to 2003.

Guthrie Group was made a public company in 1987 and was subsequently listed on the Kuala Lumpur Stock Exchange (KLSE) in 1989 in what was then the largest public issue in Malaysia.

Merger with Sime Darby 

With the government investment company Pemodalan Nasional Berhad being the largest single shareholder, the government merged Guthrie with Sime Darby and Golden Hope plantation to form a new entity named Synergy Drive, later renamed Sime Darby. All Guthrie shares were de-listed on 1 November 2007 and re-listed on 30 November 2007. As of November 2007, Sime Darby is the largest company in Malaysia by market capitalisation and also the largest plantation operator in the world with a land bank of over 540,000 hectares.

Current activities 
The group's main activities are plantation and property management. The official trading name of Guthrie is Kumpulan Guthrie Berhad. Guthrie Group has plantation estates in Peninsular Malaysia and Sabah, and northern Sumatra and West Kalimantan (Borneo) in Indonesia. The group is also engaged in real estate (with the formation of Guthrie Properties in 1994) and manufacturing.

See also 
 Tanjong Pagar Dock Company

References

External links 
 Company Overview of Kumpulan Guthrie Bhd, bloomberg.com
 Kumpulan Guthrie Berhad (MYX: 3131), bursamalaysia.com

Companies established in 1821
Defunct companies of Malaysia
Companies disestablished in 2007
1821 establishments in Asia
2007 disestablishments in Malaysia
Companies formerly listed on Bursa Malaysia
Palm oil companies of Malaysia
Agriculture companies established in the 19th century